Suva Grammar School (or SGS) is a secondary school in Suva, Fiji. The school caters 6 streams for Forms 3 to 6 and 4 streams for Form 7. Suva Grammar has a school population of approximately 1300 students. The school is in a location near the heart of the city and by the seaside. They are known to be very competitive in sports particularly in athletics at secondary school level during the annual Coca-Cola games & in the local secondary school's rugby union competition, the annual Dean's Trophy, against rival competitors Marist Brothers High School, QVS, Lelean Memorial School and RKS

History

In 1918, the British colonial government established its first school in Suva.

In 2004 the school, in cooperation with police, launched a pilot "Scholastic Crime Stoppers" programme targeting drug use, truancy and other problems.

In 2008, members of the Suva Grammar Old Students Association made a request to the Fijian Minister for Education for school principal Ilikimi Kunagogo to be removed.

In 2011, in conjunction with the Ministry of Health, Grammar heads signed a partition in which Suva Grammar School was declared the 1st drug-free secondary institution in the country.

Sports
Grammar Athletics & Grammar Ruggers

Suva Grammar has won the coveted prize of school boys' rugby, the Deans Trophy on one occasion and played to a draw with Ratu Kadavulevu School in 2005.
They were finalists in 1992,1993,2006 and 2022.

Grammar Athletics were the reigning Coca-Cola Games champions in the boys division of the Fiji Secondary School's athletics competitions from 2007–2011, having successfully defended their title for 5 straight years before losing the reigns to rival competitors Marist Brothers High School in 2012. Suva Grammar School won another title (boys division)  in 2022.
SGS has now won the Coke Games Boys title 6 times.
Suva Grammar has also won the Coke Games Girls Division 4 times.

Lions Cheerleaders

Suva Grammar is also noted for their renowned pom pom girls, who have been a fixture at the Annual Coca-Cola Games since 2002, revamping the 'Fiji style' of cheerleading in 2009 before introducing co-ed cheerleading at the 2010 Coca-Cola Games, a testament to the Grammarian trailblazing spirit of innovation and ingenuity in the lead-up to the school's Golden Jubilee celebrations later in July.
Grammar's influence in this aspect of secondary school life remains prevalent today with 2017 Coke Games Girls division champions ACS, revamping their own iconic cheerleading squad and other schools starting cheerleading squads as well such as Ballantine Memorial School, western prominent schools Saint Thomas High School, 2015 & 2017 Coke Games Boys division champions Natabua High School and 2014–2016 Coke Games Girls division champions Jasper Williams High School, and even Saint John's College Cawaci from Ovalau.

Notable alumni

Politics, business and academia

Mick Beddoes, MP and Leader of the Opposition 
Krishna Datt, government minister
Tupou Draunidalo, lawyer
Jone Madraiwiwi, vice president of Fiji
John Maynard Hedstrom, Legislative Council member
Laisenia Qarase, prime minister of Fiji
Richard Naidu, lawyer
Nazhat Shameem, High Court judge and Permanent Representative to the UN
Sree Sreenivasan, journalism professor and chief digital officer
Samisoni Tikoinasau, government minister

Sport

Makelesi Bulikiobo - National Sprint-Queen who won the 200m event at the 2007 South Pacific Games.
Jone Delai - Former national sprint-king, now Head-Coach of the Suva Grammar athletics squad.
Sakiusa Matadigo - Suva Rugby, also a Flying Fijian,
Wame Lewaravu - Suva Rugby, Sale Sharks (England) and also a Flying Fijian
Manoa Vosawai - Treviso (Italy)
Akapusi Qera - Nadroga Rugby, Gloucester Rugby (England), Fiji Rugby
Nikola Matawalu - Fiji Seven's, Flying Fijians
Henry Seniloli - Flying Fijians
Niko Verekauta - Wardens Rugby, Fiji Seven's
Saimoni Vaka - Agen (France)
Taqele Naiyaravoro - Glasgow Warriors (Scotland), currently New South Wales Waratahs (Australia) & occasional Wallabies Winger
Samuela Vunisa - Azzurri Rugby
Jerry Yanuyanutawa - Flying Fijians, Glasgow Warriors (Scotland). He grew up in Fiji, where he represented their Under-21 side. 
Viliame Mata - Fiji Seven's, Nadroga 
Sekonaia Kalou - Flying Fijians
Matila Vocea - National Rep Netball
Viliame Takayawa - National Rep Judoka, Japan Based
Bill Gadolo - National rep Rugby, Coach and Teacher

Arts

Robin Lovejoy - Australian actor and director. He grew up in Fiji.

References

Schools in Fiji